Helen Nelson may refer to:

 Helen Ewing Nelson, consumer protection advocate
 Helen Nelson (rugby union), Scottish rugby union player
 Oviya, real name Helen Nelson, Indian model and actress